Daulatpur Union is a union parishad of Harinakunda Upazila, in Jhenaidah District, Khulna Division of Bangladesh. There are 18 villages and 8 mouzas in the union.

References

External links
 

Unions of Khulna Division
Unions of Harinakunda Upazila
Unions of Jhenaidah District